In linear algebra, a multilinear map is a function of several variables that is linear separately in each variable.  More precisely, a multilinear map is a function

A multilinear map of one variable is a linear map, and of two variables is a bilinear map.  More generally, a multilinear map of k variables is called a k-linear map.  If the codomain of a multilinear map is the field of scalars, it is called a multilinear form.  Multilinear maps and multilinear forms are fundamental objects of study in multilinear algebra.

If all variables belong to the same space, one can consider symmetric, antisymmetric and alternating k-linear maps. The latter coincide if the underlying ring (or field) has a characteristic different from two, else the former two coincide.

Examples
 Any bilinear map is a multilinear map.
 The determinant of a matrix is an alternating multilinear function of the columns (or rows) of a square matrix.

Coordinate representation
Let

be a multilinear map between finite-dimensional vector spaces, where  has dimension , and  has dimension .

Then the scalars  completely determine the multilinear function .  In particular, if

Example
Let's take a trilinear function

A basis for each  is  Let

where . In other words, the constant  is a function value at one of the eight possible triples of basis vectors (since there are two choices for each of the three ), namely: 

Each vector  can be expressed as a linear combination of the basis vectors

The function value at an arbitrary collection of three vectors  can be expressed as

Or, in expanded form as

Relation to tensor products
There is a natural one-to-one correspondence between multilinear maps

and linear maps

Multilinear functions on n×n matrices
One can consider multilinear functions, on an  matrix over a commutative ring  with identity, as a function of the rows (or equivalently the columns) of the matrix. Then the multilinear function  can be written as

satisfying

If we let  represent the th row of the identity matrix, we can express each row  as the sum

Using the multilinearity of  we rewrite  as

Example
In the case of 2×2 matrices we get

Letting  we get the determinant function on 2×2 matrices:

Properties
 A multilinear map has a value of zero whenever one of its arguments is zero.

See also
 Algebraic form
 Multilinear form
 Homogeneous polynomial
 Homogeneous function
 Tensors

References

Multilinear algebra